is a 2012 rhythm game created by Sega and Crypton Future Media for the PlayStation Vita and PlayStation 3. It was released on the PlayStation Vita in Japan on August 30, 2012 as the fifth entry in the Hatsune Miku: Project DIVA series.

The game debuted at Sony's E3 2012 booth in June 2012 under the name of Hatsune Miku so as to gauge interest for the game. Like previous games in the series, the game primarily makes use of Vocaloids, a series of singing synthesizer software, and the songs created using these Vocaloids, most notably the virtual-diva Hatsune Miku.

A PlayStation 3 version of the game, titled  (the only difference being the title uses a capital F is used as opposed to the original Vita version's lowercase f) was released on March 7, 2013. This version was released physically and digitally in North America on August 27, 2013, making it the first game in the Project DIVA series to be released in the West. It was originally scheduled to be released in Europe at the same time, but instead released one week later, on September 4, 2013 as a digital download-only title. The PlayStation Vita version was later released in North America and Europe in March 2014, both as digital download-only titles as well. This therefore makes it the first game in the series to be multi-platform, with it being developed simultaneously for the PlayStation Vita and PlayStation 3, though there are some differences with regards to control schemes.

A sequel to the game, titled Hatsune Miku: Project DIVA F 2nd, was released for the PlayStation 3 and PlayStation Vita on March 27, 2014 in Japan, November 18, 2014 in North America, and November 21, 2014 in Europe.

Gameplay

The game retains the same basic gameplay mechanics from the series albeit with several new changes, most notably the addition of the "Star" symbol to the game's existing symbols of cross, circle, square, triangle and arrows. The "Star" symbol represents the "Scratch" move where  instead of pressing the face buttons as usual, players rub the screen or flick the analogue stick, depending on which system is being used.

"Chance Time" has been modified from previous installments, with each successful beat filling a star shaped gauge on the bottom left of the screen. When filled, it triggers a final scratch symbol that, if successfully scored, will change the outcome of the scene. Another new mechanic is the "Technical Zone" mechanic. When it occurs during a song, players must maintain an uninterrupted combo within that time limit for bonus points. Additional features like DIVA Room and Edit Mode will also returns with additional features.

The game features graphical improvements over its predecessors in light of the PlayStation Vita's higher processing power compared to the PlayStation Portable. The models in the game are also based on the PlayStation Portable predecessors rather than the Dreamy Theater models, which have a slightly different art style. There are also improvements in the animations of the characters, such as smoother movements for Miku's hair and Rin's ribbons; the game also features improved facial expressions and lighting with real-time lighting computation being added into the game.

Development
Development for the game first began in 2011 before the previous entry in the series, Hatsune Miku: Project DIVA Extend. The game is jointly developed by the development teams behind the PlayStation Portable entries in the series, as well as the team behind the Project DIVA Arcade entry in the series. A new entry in the Project DIVA series was first teased by Sega on Christmas Day 2011, when Sega released a teaser video on YouTube with footage of Hatsune Miku singing two different songs and the words "Coming 2012" at the end of the trailer. On April 9, 2012 Sega posted a teaser site online announcing that they would be revealing the next entry in the Project DIVA series on April 12, 2012. The game was then officially revealed on April 12, 2012 as a multiplatform game for both the PlayStation Vita and PlayStation 3 making the series' official debut on both platforms (both Dreamy Theater software for the PS3 were not actual full games for the console.) A recent "store-front trailer" showed off a new feature – officially called "Photo Studio". Development would be focused on the PlayStation Vita first before being shifted over to the PlayStation 3 at the later part of its development cycle, and hence the former version would release earlier in 2012 with the latter version releasing in 2013. The release date for the PlayStation Vita version of the game was later announced as August 20, 2012 in an issue of Japanese gaming magazine Dengeki PlayStation.

The game was also present at a booth at the Electronic Entertainment Expo 2012, where a partially translated version of the game was playable. The game featured two songs, both in Japanese as well as Japanese lyrics, but with English menu items. The demo was placed there in order to gauge interest for the game for a potential localization and the response was said to be good, although there were no official plans to localize the game at the time.

On March 7, 2013, the day of the PlayStation 3 version's Japanese release, Sega posted an image of Miku on their English Facebook page, asking fans to like and share the image if they would like to see the PlayStation 3 version of the game released in Western territories. On June 6, 2013, Sega confirmed the game would be released in Western territories in August 2013. A retail release in North America was announced, as well as a digital release on the PlayStation Network in North America and Europe. In November 2013, the PlayStation Vita version was announced for digital release in North America and Europe in March 2014.

Reception
The PS Vita version of Hatsune Miku: Project DIVA f took first place on the Japanese sales charts in its debut week, selling 159,592 physical retail copies. The PS3 version released one year later sold 110,229 physical retail copies within its debut week in Japan, also topping the weekly charts. By 20 April 2013, Sega announced that the game shipped a total of 390,000 copies across both platforms.

PlayStation LifeStyle's import review was very favorable, calling the main portion of the rhythm game "as solid as they come" and recommending it to importers. The PS3 version received a review score of 35/40 from Famitsu.

Song list
There are a total of 38 songs available between Hatsune Miku: Project DIVA f/F. (6 songs returning from previous games)  6 songs are only available through AR Live Mode on the Vita and Live Studio Mode on the PS3, 1 song is DLC and must be purchased from the PlayStation Network, which is only in the Japanese version. The 6 Bonus Songs are included with Project DIVA F on the PS3, but were released as DLC for the Vita version of the game.

Songs with a light-blue background are returning songs from previous games.
Songs with a yellow background are songs only available in 'AR Live Mode' for the Vita and 'Live Stage Mode' for the PS3, all based on DAIBA de DIVA at Tokyo Joypolis, held from August 14 to September 2, 2012.
Songs with an orange background are DLC and must be purchased on the PlayStation Network to be played. (Japanese version only)
Songs with a green background are new songs in Project DIVA F for the PS3. They were released as DLC for the Vita version of the game.

References

External links
 (PlayStation Vita version)
 (PlayStation 3 version)

2012 video games
Hatsune Miku: Project DIVA games
Music video games
PlayStation 3 games
PlayStation Vita games
Sega video games
Creative works using vocaloids
Video games developed in Japan